George Jack Taylor (23 October 1948 – 22 February 2017) was a Scottish  professional footballer who played as a winger.

References

1948 births
2017 deaths
Footballers from Dundee
Scottish footballers
Association football wingers
Grimsby Town F.C. players
English Football League players